Methylammonium iodide in an organic halide with a formula of CH3NH3I. It is an ammonium salt composed of methylamine and hydrogen iodide. The primary application for methylammonium iodide, sometimes in combination with other methylammonium halides, is as a component of perovskite (structure) crystalline solar cells.

References 

Methylammonium compounds
Iodides